Edward W. Harbert III (born June 15, 1955) is an American broadcasting and television executive. He was the Chairman of NBC Broadcasting, and the President and CEO of the Comcast Entertainment Group, and Chairman of ABC Entertainment.

Early life and career
Born in 1955 in New York, Harbert is the son of Marna and Edward W. Harbert II, a pioneering television, advertising, and publishing executive. One of six children, Harbert grew up immersed in television, and aspired to a career in the industry while still a child.  In a 2005 article in Advertising Age, Harbert wrote, “I started poring over the ratings in Nielsen 'Pocket Pieces' when I was 9 years old. Two years later, I learned there were jobs at networks that picked shows and decided where they went on the schedule. From that moment, I wanted one of those jobs.”

Harbert began his broadcasting career while a student at Boston University’s college radio station, WTBU, where he worked alongside his friend, Howard Stern.  After graduating magna cum laude with a degree in Broadcasting and Film from the Boston University School of Communications, Harbert returned to New York, where he worked at ABC.  He relocated to Los Angeles in 1981 and spent 20 years at ABC, rising from a feature film coordinator to president of ABC Entertainment. At ABC, Harbert was closely associated with groundbreaking programs such as The Wonder Years, NYPD Blue, The Practice,  and My So Called Life, among many others, and, during his tenure, ABC moved to the top in primetime programs in 1995 for the first time in 17 years, and led all the networks in profits for several years.

In 1999, after a two-year post as a producer for DreamWorks TV, Harbert was named president of NBC Studios, overseeing primetime, day time, and late night programs.

In 2004, Harbert was appointed to the position of president, E! Networks.  In 2006, he was promoted to the newly created position of president and CEO at the Comcast Entertainment Group, overseeing E!, Style Network, G4, Comcast International Media Group, and Comcast Entertainment Productions.  When Harbert extended his contract with Comcast in 2010, it was noted that E!, in particular, had been a "big success" under his auspices, achieving six straight years of record ratings.

Harbert was appointed to his most recent position in 2011, following Comcast's acquisition of NBC Universal.  He was responsible for NBC Advertising Sales, the NBC Owned Television Stations, Affiliate Relations, Network Research, Domestic Television Distribution, NBCUniversal Digital Entertainment and Special Events. In 2013, it was announced that Harbert would oversee NBC Late Night. During Harbert's tenure, The Tonight Show returned to its birthplace of New York City, a move coinciding with the transition of hosts from Jay Leno to Jimmy Fallon, while Seth Meyers took former Saturday Night Live castmate Fallon's slot on Late Night. Harbert left NBCUniversal in 2016.

In pop culture
Harbert, who appeared as himself in an episode of Curb Your Enthusiasm, is frequently referenced on the Howard Stern Show. Additionally, Harbert has been described as a "bold-faced name," due in part to a four-year relationship with comedian Chelsea Handler.

Personal life
Harbert was linked romantically with Chelsea Handler starting in 2005. They broke up in 2010 according to Handler because the two couldn't separate business and pleasure.

Harbert and Lisa Medrano, a former human resources executive, were married on June 11, 2011. Harbert has two children, Emily and Will, from a previous marriage.

He serves on the boards of Urban Arts Partnership, the Friends of the Saban Free Clinic, City Year LA, Paley Center for Media, Hollywood Radio and Television Society, and the Executive Committee of Boston University's School of Communications.

References

External links

 NBC
 Comcast
 Boston University College of Communication

1955 births
American chief executives
Television personalities from New York City
Boston University College of Communication alumni
Comcast people
Living people
Businesspeople from New York City
American Broadcasting Company executives
Presidents of American Broadcasting Company Entertainment
American chairpersons of corporations
American corporate directors